Ece is a Turkish word meaning queen and may refer to:

 Umay, also known as Ece, the Turkic earth goddess

Given names
 Ece Ayhan Çağlar (1931–2002), Turkish poet
 Ece Ege (born 1963), Turkish fashion designer
 Ece Erken (born 1978), Turkish actress
 Ece Hocaoğlu (born 1994), Turkish volleyball player
 Ece Seçkin (born 1991), Turkish singer
 Ece Tekmen (born 2002), Turkeish women's footballer
 Ece Temelkuran (born 1973), Turkish journalist
 Ece Türkoğlu (born 1999), Turkish football player
 Ece Uslu (born 1974), Turkish actress
 Ece Yağmur Yavuz (born 2004), Turkish artistic gymnast
 Ece Yaşar (born 1990), Turkish karateka

Surname
 Arzu Ece (born 1963), Turkish singer
 Keriman Halis Ece (1913–2012), Turkish pianist, fashion model and Miss Turkey 1932
 Meral Hussein-Ece, Baroness Hussein-Ece (born 1953), British Liberal Democrat member of the House of Lords

See also
 Ecem

Turkish feminine given names
Turkish-language surnames